Granada is a province of southern Spain, in the eastern part of the autonomous community of Andalusia. It is bordered by the provinces of Albacete, Murcia, Almería, Jaén, Córdoba, Málaga, and the Mediterranean Sea (along the Costa Tropical). Its capital city is also called Granada.

It contains 170 municipalities.

Geography

The tallest mountain in the Iberian Peninsula, Mulhacén, is located in Granada. It measures . The next highest mountains in the province are Veleta and Alcazaba.

The river Genil, which rises in Granada, is one of the main tributaries of the Guadalquivir. Other important rivers include the Fardes, Monachil, Guadalfeo, Dílar, Ízbor, Verde and Darro.

Granada shares the Sierra Nevada National Park (in the Sierra Nevada mountain range) with Almería province. Another important range is the Sierra de Baza.

The northern part of the province, comprising the districts of Baza and Huescar is known as the Granada Altiplano.

Important monuments

The Alhambra World Heritage Site, Granada's biggest tourist attraction, showcases one of the very finest architectural legacies of Moorish rule in Spain, which in Granada lasted from 711 until 1492.

There are Roman Catholic cathedrals at Granada and Guadix.

The Royal Chapel of Granada houses the remains of the Catholic Monarchs, Isabella I of Castile (1451–1504) and Ferdinand II of Aragon (1452–1516); as well as of their daughter Joanna of Castile (1479-1555) and of her husband Philip the Handsome (1478-1506).

Economy

 Tourism
The coast of Granada province is known as the Costa Tropical. It attracts large numbers of both Spanish and foreign holiday-makers. The main resorts are Almuñecar, Salobreña and La Herradura. The city of Granada brings in tourists from all over the world thanks to its Moorish architecture, especially the famous Alhambra palace. In the winter the mountains of the Sierra Nevada play host to Europe's most southerly ski resort. Hiking and eco-tourism also attract a number of visitors to areas such as the Alpujarras and Lecrin Valley.

 Major employers
Puleva: founded in Granada in 1910, the company has been a subsidiary of the Lactalis group since 2001. It produces a wide range of dairy products, including milk and milkshakes, cream and products for infants. Puleva Biotech S.A. developed the first infant formula to contain nucleotides, and was a pioneer in the use of Omega-3 fatty acids in infant food products.

Coviran: supermarket chain which operates on a franchise basis, specialising in small, neighbourhood shops. It has 2,501 supermarkets across the whole of Spain and Portugal.

 University and language students
The University of Granada is one of the largest universities in Spain, with approximately 56,000 students. Each year the city also attracts over 10,000 foreign students, including over 2,000 European students through the Erasmus programme. As well as providing employment to a large number of people, the university also boosts the local economy by creating demand for rental property. The money spent by students also helps to support shops, restaurants, bars and other services in the city. In recent years the university has also been working to capitalise on the research it does through commercial ventures.

 Other
Primary industries such as agriculture and fishing play an important role in the local economy. There was previously also a very large construction sector, but as of 2011 it was experiencing a deep downturn. The Granada Health Science Technological Park has created some high-skilled jobs in the biotechnology sector.

Population development
The historical population is given in the following chart:

See also 
 List of municipalities in Granada
 Emirate of Granada
 Province of Spain
 Sierra Nevada National Park

Notes and references

External links 

 Maps of Granada Province
  Diputación Provincial de Granada (Provincial government)
  Natural Park of Sierra Nevada
  Natural Park of Sierra de Baza
  Natural Park of Sierra de Castril
  Natural Park of Sierra de Huétor
  Natural Paraje Cliffs of Maro - Cerro Gordo